Sun Yuxi (born October 1951) was a Chinese diplomat. He was born in Harbin, Heilongjiang. He was a graduate of Beijing Foreign Studies University and the London School of Economics. He was Ambassador of the People's Republic of China to Afghanistan (2002–2005), India (2005–2007), Italy (2008–2010) and Poland (2010–2012). He was spokesperson for the Ministry of Foreign Affairs of the People's Republic of China and deputy director of its information department.

References

1951 births
Living people
Diplomats of the People's Republic of China
Ambassadors of China to Afghanistan
Ambassadors of China to India
Ambassadors of China to Italy
Ambassadors of China to Poland
Spokespersons for the Ministry of Foreign Affairs of the People's Republic of China
Ministry of Foreign Affairs of the People's Republic of China officials
Beijing Foreign Studies University alumni
Alumni of the London School of Economics
People from Harbin